The Tylosaurinae are a subfamily of mosasaurs, a diverse group of Late Cretaceous marine squamates. Members of the subfamily are informally and collectively known as "tylosaurines" and have been recovered from every continent except for South America. The subfamily includes the genera Tylosaurus, Taniwhasaurus, Hainosaurus and Kaikaifilu, although some scientists argue that only Tylosaurus and Taniwhasaurus should be included.

Tylosaurines first appeared in the Coniacian and gave rise to some of the largest mosasaurs within the genera Tylosaurus and Hainosaurus which came to dominate as apex predators in marine ecosystems throughout the Santonian and Campanian, but appear to have been largely replaced by large mosasaurines, such as Mosasaurus, by the end of the Maastrichtian. Nevertheless, the subfamily survived to the end of the Cretaceous, covering a period lasting approximately twenty million years.

The etymology of this group derives from the genus Tylosaurus (Greek tylos = "knob" + Greek sauros = "lizard").

Description 

In general, tylosaurines were large-bodied marine lizards armed with sturdy, conical teeth and an elongated premaxilla and extensions of the dentaries that do not bear teeth to the very end such as is found in other genera of mosasaurs.  Cope's original concept of a "battering ram" snout is not supported by fossil evidence.  Stomach contents from a tylosaur recovered in South Dakota included remains of another mosasaur, a bony fish, the large, flightless seabird Hesperornis, and possibly a shark, indicating that tylosaurs were generalists. Another specimen collected by Charles Sternberg  included the bones of a small plesiosaur (see also ).

Lingham-Soliar  suggested that tylosaurines were not among the fastest swimming nor the strongest mosasaurids. However, they are lightly built, having greatly reduced the weight of their bodies and possessing relatively small pectoral and pelvic girdles, fore- and hindlimbs. Their bone is highly cancellous and may have been impregnated with fat cells during life, adding buoyancy. These traits suggest that tylosaurs may have been ambush predators. Tylosaurs were among the largest mosasaurs, with some species of Tylosaurus and Hainosaurus reaching lengths of 9-12+ meters, making them among the largest of all marine reptiles.

Russell (1967, pp. 170 ) defined the Tylosaurinae as follows: "Large rostrum present anterior to premaxillary teeth. Twelve or more teeth in dentary and maxilla. Cranial nerves X, XI, and XII leave lateral wall of opisthotic through a single foramen. No canal in basioccipital or basispehnoid for basilar artery. Suprastapedial process of quadrate moderately large, distally pointed. Dorsal edge of surangular rounded and longitudinally horizontal...Twenty nine presacral vertebrae present. Length of presacral series less than that of postsacral series in Tylosaurus, neural spines of posterior caudal vertebrae at most only slightly elongated, do not form an appreciable fin. Haemal arches unfused to caudal centra. Appendicular elements lack smoothly finished articular surfaces."

Species and taxonomy 
Tylosaurinae
Tylosaurus
T. proriger
T. nepaeolicus (=T. kansasensis)
T. pembinensis
T. gaudryi
T. saskatchewanensis
T. ivoensis
T. iembeensisHainosaurus (=Tylosaurus?)H. bernardiTaniwhasaurusT. oweni (=Tylosaurus haumuriensis)T. antarcticusKaikaifiluK. herveiReferences

 Further reading
Bell, G. L. Jr., 1997. A phylogenetic revision of North American and Adriatic Mosasauroidea. pp. 293–332 In Callaway J. M. and E. L Nicholls, (eds.), Ancient Marine Reptiles, Academic Press, 501 pp.
Lindgren, J. et. Siverson, M. 2002.Tylosaurus ivoensis: a giant mosasaur from the early Campanian of Sweden. Royal Society of Edinburgh Transactions: Earth Sciences Vol. 93(1):73-93.
Russell, D. A. 1970. The vertebrate fauna of the Selma Formation of Alabama, Part VII, The mosasaurs, Fieldiana: Geology Memoirs'' 3(7):369-380.

 

nl:Tylosaurus